Air Marshal Shirish Baban Deo, PVSM, AVSM, VM, VSM, ADC was the Vice Chief of the Air Staff (VCAS) of the Indian Air Force. He assumed the office of Vice Chief on 31 December 2016 from Air Chief Marshal Birender Singh Dhanoa and served in the same capacity till his retirement on 30 September 2018.

Early life and education 
Deo was born in Nagpur, Maharashtra. He attended Somalwar School and is an alumnus of Defence Services Staff College, Wellington.

Career 

Deo was commissioned into the fighter stream of the Indian Air Force on 15 June 1979. He has clocked more than 4000 hours of operational and training flying experience. He held several key operational and administrative appointments at various stages of his service including Fighter Combat Leader; A2 qualified instructor and Directing Staff at TACDE; Chief Operations Officer of a front-line forward base; Commanding Officer of Air Force Station Jodhpur; Director General Air Operations at Air Headquarters; Air Officer Commanding of COBRA Group; AD Commander; Air-I at Headquarters; Central Air Command; Air Officer Commanding in Chief of Eastern Air Command and Air Officer Commanding in Chief of Western Air Command.

Awards and medals 
Deo has been awarded several medals: the Param Vishisht Seva Medal, the Ati Vishisht Seva Medal, the Vishisht Seva Medal, and the Vayu Sena Medal.  He was also appointed as Honorary ADC to the President of India on 1 January 2016

Personal life 
Deo is married to Mrs. Anjna Deo and they have a son, Karan Deo, who is a group captain in the Indian Air Force. His younger brother, Justice Rohit Deo, is elevated as a Judge of the Bombay High Court on 5 June 2017.

References 

Year of birth missing (living people)
Living people
Vice Chiefs of Air Staff (India)
Indian Air Force air marshals
People from Nagpur
Recipients of the Param Vishisht Seva Medal
Indian Air Force officers
Recipients of the Vayu Sena Medal
Recipients of the Ati Vishisht Seva Medal
Military personnel from Maharashtra
Defence Services Staff College alumni